Simran Pareenja is an Indian actress who primarily works in Hindi television. She made her acting debut in 2015 with Tu Mera Hero portraying Rajni. Pareenja is best known for her portrayal of Bhoomi Agrawal Prajapati in Bhagyalaxmi and her dual portrayal of Kaali Nandu Singh and Thakurain Pavitra in Kaala Teeka.

Pareenja made her film debut in 2018 with the Telugu film Kirrak Party.

Career 
Pareenja made her acting debut in 2015 with Tu Mera Hero portraying Rajni. She then portrayed Bhoomi Agrawal Prajapati opposite Varun Sharma in Bhagyalaxmi from 2015 to 2016.

From 2015 to 2017, she portrayed Kaali Nandu Singh opposite Mayank Gandhi and Rohan Gandotra in Kaala Teeka. It proved as a major turning point in her career. She portrayed her character's on-screen daughter Thakurain Pavitra Sinha opposite Karan Sharma in 2017.

Pareenja made her film debut in 2018 with the Telugu film Kirrak Party, portraying Meera Joseph opposite Nikhil Siddharth. It received mixed reviews from the critics. The same year, she portrayed Nayan opposite Jay Soni in an episode of Laal Ishq.

From 2019 to 2020, she portrayed Gunjan Sharma Shrivastava in Ishaaron Ishaaron Mein opposite Mudit Nayar. In 2021, she portrayed Maithili Tiwari Kumar in Lakshmi Ghar Aayi opposite Akshit Sukhija. It ended within two months due to COVID-19 pandemic.

Pareenja will next appear in the Telugu films Ee Kathalo Nenu alongside Homanand and Revanth and Nuvvakkada Nenikkada alongside Parvatheesam. She has completed her shoot for both the films.

Filmography

Films 

All films are in Telugu unless otherwise noted.

Television

See also
List of Indian television actresses

References

External links

Indian television actresses
Living people
Actresses in Hindi television
21st-century Indian actresses
Year of birth missing (living people)